Growth delay-hydrocephaly-lung hypoplasia syndrome, also known as Game-Friedman-Paradice syndrome is a very rare hereditary disorder which is characterized by developmental, lung, and brain anomalies. Only 4 cases have been reported in medical literature.

Signs and symptoms 

The following is a list of the symptoms usually shown by fetuses with the disorder:

Delayed fetal growth
Hydrocephaly
Sylvius patent aqueduct
Micrognathia
Poorly developed (hypoplastic) lungs
Malrotated intestines
Omphalocele
Shortening of the lower limbs
Tibia bowing
Generalized foot abnormalities

History 

It was first discovered in 1989, by Game et al. when they described 4 fetus siblings (3 females, 1 male) born to healthy, non-consanguineous parents with all the symptoms mentioned above. The siblings were terminated and all of them (post-mortem examination) had a size similar to fetuses of younger gestational age.

References 

Genetic diseases and disorders
Rare genetic syndromes
Lung disorders
Brain disorders
Congenital disorders of respiratory system
Congenital disorders of nervous system
Neurodevelopmental disorders